Squillidae is a family of mantis shrimp, the only family in the superfamily Squilloidea. The type genus is Squilla. It is the stomatopod family with the most genera, as follows:

Alima Leach, 1817
Alimopsis Manning, 1977
Alimopsoides Moosa, 1991
Anchisquilla Manning, 1968
Anchisquilloides Manning, 1977
Anchisquillopsis Moosa, 1986
Areosquilla Manning, 1976
Belosquilla Ahyong, 2001
Busquilla Manning, 1978
Carinosquilla Manning, 1968
Clorida Eydoux & Souleyet, 1842
Cloridina Manning, 1995
Cloridopsis Manning, 1968
Crenatosquilla Manning, 1984
Dictyosquilla Manning, 1968
Distosquilla Manning, 1977
Erugosquilla Manning, 1995
Fallosquilla Manning, 1995
Fennerosquilla Manning & Camp, 1983
Gibbesia Manning & Heard, 1997
Harpiosquilla Holthuis, 1964
Humesosquilla Manning & Camp, 2001
Kaisquilla Ahyong, 2002
Kempella Low & Ahyong, 2010
Lenisquilla Manning, 1977
Leptosquilla Miers, 1880
Levisquilla Manning, 1977
Lophosquilla Manning, 1968
Meiosquilla Manning, 1968
Miyakella Ahyong & Low, 2013
Natosquilla Manning, 1978
Neclorida Manning, 1995
Neoanchisquilla Manning, 1978
Oratosquilla Manning, 1968
Oratosquillina Manning, 1995
Paralimopsis Mossa, 1991
Parvisquilla Manning, 1973
Pontiosquilla Manning, 1995
Pterygosquilla Hilgendorf, 1890
Quollastria Ahyong, 2001
Rissoides Manning & Lewisohn, 1982
Schmittius Manning, 1972
Squilla Fabicius, 1787
Squilloides Manning, 1968
Tuleariosquilla Manning, 1978
Visaya  Ahyong, 2004

References

External links

Stomatopoda
Crustacean families